Harsh Mahajan(ex- Animal Husbandry minister of Himachal Pradesh), son of a former Vidhan Sabha Speaker and Cabinet Minister Des Raj Mahajan and was born at Chamba on 12 December 1955. He has a B. Com. and MBA. He studied at Sriram College of Commerce, New Delhi and at Delhi University, New Delhi. He married Uma Singh on 7 June 1983.

He was the President of State Youth Congress from 1986 to 1995.

He got elected to the State Legislative Assembly first in November 1993 and again in 1998 and 2003.
He has been the Parliamentary Secretary from 1994 to 1998 and has served as Animal Husbandry Minister (at the Cabinet level). He is also a native speaker of English and Hindi.

On 28 September 2022, Himachal Pradesh state Congress working president and former cabinet minister Harsh Mahajan joined Bharatiya Janata Party (BJP).

References

People from Chamba, Himachal Pradesh
Bharatiya Janata Party politicians from Himachal Pradesh
Former members of Indian National Congress from Himachal Pradesh
Living people
1955 births
Himachal Pradesh MLAs 1993–1998
Himachal Pradesh MLAs 1998–2003
Himachal Pradesh MLAs 2003–2007